Francis Colton Hammond (November 9, 1931 – March 26, 1953) was a United States Navy hospital corpsman who was killed in action in Korea while serving with a Marine Corps rifle company during the Korean War. He posthumously received the Medal of Honor for his heroic actions above and beyond the call of duty during the night of March 26–27, 1953 during the Battle for Outpost Vegas.

Biography
Born and raised mostly in Alexandria, Virginia, Hammond graduated from Alexandria's George Washington High School in January 1951.

He joined the U.S. Navy from Alexandria on March 20, 1951. He was sent to and arrived in Korea on February 1, 1953, assigned to 3rd Platoon, C Company, 1st Battalion, 5th Marine Regiment, 1st Marine Division. During the night of March 26, he was killed in action at Outpost Reno. During a counterattack against an entrenched enemy force, he exposed himself to intense hostile fire in order to attend to wounded Marines, even after he had been wounded himself. When a relief unit arrived and his own unit was ordered to pull back, Hammond remained in the area, helping evacuate casualties and assisting the newly arrived corpsmen. While doing this, he was killed by mortar fire. For his heroic actions on March 26–27, he was posthumously awarded the Medal of Honor in September 1953.

Hammond, age 21, was buried on June 10, 1953, at Arlington National Cemetery.

Hammond who had been married on June 19, 1952, was survived by his wife Phyllis and a son, Francis, Jr. His wife and son were posthumously presented Hammond's Medal of Honor by Secretary of the Navy Robert B. Anderson during a ceremony at the White House in late December 1953.

Military awards
Hammond's military awards and decorations include:

Medal of Honor citation
Hammond's official Medal of Honor citation reads:

The President of the United States in the name of the Congress takes pride in presenting the Medal of Honor posthumously to

for service as set forth in the following

CITATION:

Honors
A new high school in Hammond's hometown of Alexandria was named in his honor and opened in 1956. Alexandria City Public Schools changed to a 6-2-2-2 configuration in 1971, and the city's three high schools changed from four-year to two-year campuses. All of the city's juniors and seniors attended the newest high school, T.C. Williams, while Hammond and George Washington split the freshmen and sophomores. Both Hammond and George Washington became junior high schools (grades 7–9) in 1979 and then middle schools (grades 6–8) in 1993.

The frigate  was named in his honor and commissioned on July 25, 1970.

See also

 List of Korean War Medal of Honor recipients

References

External links
 Francis Colton Hammond at ArlingtonCemetery.net, an unofficial website
 Alexandria City Public Schools – Francis Hammond
 

1931 births
1953 deaths
Military personnel from Alexandria, Virginia
United States Navy corpsmen
American military personnel killed in the Korean War
United States Navy Medal of Honor recipients
Burials at Arlington National Cemetery
Korean War recipients of the Medal of Honor
United States Navy personnel of the Korean War